The tomato ( or ) is the edible berry of the plant Solanum lycopersicum, commonly known as the tomato plant. The species originated in western South America, Mexico, and Central America. The Mexican Nahuatl word  gave rise to the Spanish word , from which the English word tomato derived. Its domestication and use as a cultivated food may have originated with the indigenous peoples of Mexico. The Aztecs used tomatoes in their cooking at the time of the Spanish conquest of the Aztec Empire, and after the Spanish encountered the tomato for the first time after their contact with the Aztecs, they brought the plant to Europe, in a widespread transfer of plants known as the Columbian exchange. From there, the tomato was introduced to other parts of the European-colonized world during the 16th century. 

Tomatoes are a significant source of umami flavor. They are consumed in diverse ways: raw or cooked, and in many dishes, sauces, salads, and drinks. While tomatoes are fruits—botanically classified as berries—they are commonly used culinarily as a vegetable ingredient or side dish.

Numerous varieties of the tomato plant are widely grown in temperate climates across the world, with greenhouses allowing for the production of tomatoes throughout all seasons of the year. They are vines that have a weak stem that sprawls and typically needs support. Indeterminate tomato plants are perennials in their native habitat, but are cultivated as annuals. (Determinate, or bush, plants are annuals that stop growing at a certain height and produce a crop all at once.)

Names

Etymology 
The word tomato comes from the Spanish , which in turn comes from the Nahuatl word   , meaning 'swelling fruit'; also 'fat water' or 'fat thing'. When Aztecs started to cultivate the fruit to be larger, sweeter and red, they called the new variety  (or ), ('plump with navel' or 'fat water with navel'). The specific name lycopersicum (from the 1753 book ) is of Greek origin, meaning 'wolf peach'.

Pronunciation 
The word's dual pronunciations were immortalized in Ira and George Gershwin's 1937 song "Let's Call the Whole Thing Off" ("You like  and I like  / You like  and I like ") and have become a symbol for nitpicking pronunciation disputes. In this capacity, it has even become an American and British slang term: saying "" when presented with two choices can mean "What's the difference?" or "It's all the same to me".

Botany

Description 

Indeterminate types are "tender" perennials, dying annually in temperate climates (they are originally native to tropical highlands), although they can live up to three years in a greenhouse in some cases. Determinate types are annual in all climates.

Tomato plants are dicots, and grow as a series of branching stems, with a terminal bud at the tip that does the actual growing. When the tip eventually stops growing, whether because of pruning or flowering, lateral buds take over and grow into other, fully functional, vines.

Tomato vines are typically pubescent, meaning covered with fine short hairs. The hairs facilitate the vining process, turning into roots wherever the plant is in contact with the ground and moisture, especially if the vine's connection to its original root has been damaged or severed.

Most tomato plants have compound leaves, and are called regular leaf (RL) plants, but some cultivars have simple leaves known as potato leaf (PL) style because of their resemblance to that particular relative. Of RL plants, there are variations, such as rugose leaves, which are deeply grooved, and variegated, angora leaves, which have additional colors where a genetic mutation causes chlorophyll to be excluded from some portions of the leaves.

Their flowers, appearing on the apical meristem, have the anthers fused along the edges, forming a column surrounding the pistil's style. Flowers in domestic cultivars can be self-fertilizing.

Although in culinary terms, tomato is regarded as a vegetable, its fruit is classified botanically as a berry. As a true fruit, it develops from the ovary of the plant after fertilization, its flesh comprising the pericarp walls. The fruit contains hollow spaces full of seeds and moisture, called locular cavities. These vary, among cultivated species, according to type. Some smaller varieties have two cavities, globe-shaped varieties typically have three to five, beefsteak tomatoes have a great number of smaller cavities, while paste tomatoes have very few, very small cavities.

For propagation, the seeds need to come from a mature fruit, and must be lightly fermented to remove the gelatinous outer coating and then dried before use.

Classification 
In 1753, Linnaeus placed the tomato in the genus Solanum (alongside the potato) as Solanum lycopersicum. In 1768, Philip Miller moved it to its own genus, naming it Lycopersicon esculentum. The name came into wide use, but was technically in breach of the plant naming rules because Linnaeus's species name lycopersicum still had priority. Although the name Lycopersicum lycopersicum was suggested by Karsten (1888), it is not used because it violates the International Code of Nomenclature barring the use of tautonyms in botanical nomenclature. The corrected name Lycopersicon lycopersicum (Nicolson 1974) was technically valid, because Miller's genus name and Linnaeus's species name differ in exact spelling, but since Lycopersicon esculentum has become so well known, it was officially listed as a nomen conservandum in 1983, and would be the correct name for the tomato in classifications which do not place the tomato in the genus Solanum.

Genetic evidence has now shown that Linnaeus was correct to put the tomato in the genus Solanum, making Solanum lycopersicum the correct name. Both names, however, will probably be found in the literature for some time. Two of the major reasons for considering the genera separate are the leaf structure (tomato leaves are markedly different from any other Solanum), and the biochemistry (many of the alkaloids common to other Solanum species are conspicuously absent from the tomato). On the other hand, hybrids of tomato and diploid potato can be created in the lab by somatic fusion, and are partially fertile, providing evidence of the close relationship between these species.

Genetics and genetic modification

Genome 
An international consortium of researchers from 10 countries, began sequencing the tomato genome in 2004. A prerelease version of the genome was made available in December 2009. The complete genome for the cultivar Heinz 1706 was published on 31 May 2012 in Nature. The latest reference genome published in 2021 had 799 MB and encodes 34,384 (predicted) proteins, spread over 12 chromosomes.

Genetic modification 

Since many other fruits, like strawberries, apples, melons, and bananas share the same characteristics and genes, researchers stated the published genome could help to improve food quality, food security and reduce costs of all of these fruits.

The first commercially available genetically modified food was a tomato called Flavr Savr, which was engineered to have a longer shelf life. However, it is no longer commercially available. Scientists are continuing to develop tomatoes with new traits not found in natural crops, such as increased resistance to pests or environmental stresses or better flavor.

Breeding 

The Tomato Genetic Resource Center, Germplasm Resources Information Network, AVRDC, and numerous seed banks around the world store seed representing genetic variations of value to modern agriculture. These seed stocks are available for legitimate breeding and research efforts. While individual breeding efforts can produce useful results, the bulk of tomato breeding work is at universities and major agriculture-related corporations. These efforts have resulted in significant regionally adapted breeding lines and hybrids, such as the Mountain series from North Carolina. Corporations including Heinz, Monsanto, BHNSeed, and Bejoseed have breeding programs that attempt to improve production, size, shape, color, flavor, disease tolerance, pest tolerance, nutritional value, and numerous other traits.

Fruit versus vegetable 

Botanically, a tomato is a fruit—a berry, consisting of the ovary, together with its seeds, of a flowering plant. However, the tomato is considered a "culinary vegetable" because it has a much lower sugar content than culinary fruits; because it is more savoury (umami) than sweet, it is typically served as part of a salad or main course of a meal, rather than as a dessert. Tomatoes are not the only food source with this ambiguity; bell peppers, cucumbers, green beans, aubergines/eggplants, avocados, and squashes of all kinds (such as courgettes/zucchini and pumpkins) are all botanically fruit, yet cooked as vegetables.

The confusion on whether tomatoes are fruits or vegetables has led to legal dispute in the United States. In 1887, U.S. tariff laws that imposed a duty on vegetables, but not on fruit, caused the tomato's status to become a matter of legal importance. In Nix v. Hedden, the U.S. Supreme Court settled the tariff controversy on May 10, 1893, by declaring that the tomato is a vegetable, based on the popular definition that classifies vegetables by use—they are generally served with dinner and not dessert. The holding of this case applies only to the interpretation of the Tariff of 1883, and the court did not purport to reclassify the tomato for botanical or other purposes.

History 

The wild ancestor of the tomato, Solanum pimpinellifolium, is native to western South America. These wild versions were the size of peas. The first evidence of domestication points to the Aztecs and other peoples in Mesoamerica, who used the fruit fresh and in their cooking. The Spanish first introduced tomatoes to Europe, where they became used in Spanish food. In France, Italy and northern Europe, the tomato was initially grown as an ornamental plant. It was regarded with suspicion as a food because botanists recognized it as a nightshade, a relative of the poisonous belladonna. This was exacerbated by the interaction of the tomato's acidic juice with pewter plates. The leaves and fruit contain tomatine, which in large quantities would be toxic. However, the ripe fruit contains a much lower amount of tomatine than the immature fruit.

Mesoamerica 
The exact date of domestication is unknown; by 500 BC, it was already being cultivated in southern Mexico and probably other areas. The Pueblo people are thought to have believed that those who witnessed the ingestion of tomato seeds were blessed with powers of divination. The large, lumpy variety of tomato, a mutation from a smoother, smaller fruit, originated in Mesoamerica, and may be the direct ancestor of some modern cultivated tomatoes.

The Aztecs raised several varieties of tomato, with red tomatoes called  and green tomatoes called  (tomatillo). Bernardino de Sahagún reported seeing a great variety of tomatoes in the Aztec market at Tenochtitlán (Mexico City): "large tomatoes, small tomatoes, leaf tomatoes, sweet tomatoes, large serpent tomatoes, nipple-shaped tomatoes", and tomatoes of all colors from the brightest red to the deepest yellow. Bernardino de Sahagún mentioned Aztecs cooking various sauces, some with and without tomatoes of different sizes, serving them in city markets: "foods sauces, hot sauces; fried [food], olla-cooked [food], juices, sauces of juices, shredded [food] with chile, with squash seeds [most likely Cucurbita pepo], with tomatoes, with smoked chile, with hot chile, with yellow chile, with mild red chile sauce, yellow chile sauce, hot chile sauce, with "bird excrement" sauce, sauce of smoked chile, heated [sauces], bean sauce; [he sells] toasted beans, cooked beans, mushroom sauce, sauce of small squash, sauce of large tomatoes, sauce of ordinary tomatoes, sauce of various kinds of sour herbs, avocado sauce."

Spanish distribution 
Spanish conquistador Hernán Cortés may have been the first to transfer a small yellow tomato to Europe after he captured the Aztec city of Tenochtitlan, now Mexico City, in 1521. The earliest discussion of the tomato in European literature appeared in a herbal written in 1544 by Pietro Andrea Mattioli, an Italian physician and botanist, who suggested that a new type of eggplant had been brought to Italy that was blood red or golden color when mature and could be divided into segments and eaten like an eggplant—that is, cooked and seasoned with salt, black pepper, and oil.

After the Spanish colonization of the Americas, the Spanish distributed the tomato throughout their colonies in the Caribbean. They also took it to the Philippines, from where it spread to southeast Asia and then the entire Asian continent. The Spanish also brought the tomato to Europe. It grew easily in Mediterranean climates, and cultivation began in the 1540s. It was probably eaten shortly after it was introduced, and was certainly being used as food by the early 17th century in Spain.

China 
The tomato was introduced to China, likely via the Philippines or Macau, in the 1500s. It was given the name  (barbarian eggplant), as the Chinese named many foodstuffs introduced from abroad, but referring specifically to early introductions.

Italy 

The recorded history of tomatoes in Italy dates back to at least 31 October 1548, when the house steward of Cosimo de' Medici, the grand duke of Tuscany, wrote to the Medici private secretary informing him that the basket of tomatoes sent from the grand duke's Florentine estate at Torre del Gallo "had arrived safely". Tomatoes were grown mainly as ornamentals early on after their arrival in Italy. For example, the Florentine aristocrat Giovanvettorio Soderini wrote how they "were to be sought only for their beauty", and were grown only in gardens or flower beds. The tomato's ability to mutate and create new and different varieties helped contribute to its success and spread throughout Italy. However, even in areas where the climate supported growing tomatoes, their habit of growing to the ground suggested low status. They were not adopted as a staple of the peasant population because they were not as filling as other fruits already available. Additionally, both toxic and inedible varieties discouraged many people from attempting to consume or prepare any other varieties. In certain areas of Italy, such as Florence, the fruit was used solely as a tabletop decoration, until it was incorporated into the local cuisine in the late 17th or early 18th century. The earliest discovered cookbook with tomato recipes was published in Naples in 1692, though the author had apparently obtained these recipes from Spanish sources.

Unique varieties were developed over the next several hundred years for uses such as dried tomatoes, sauce tomatoes, pizza tomatoes, and tomatoes for long-term storage. These varieties are usually known for their place of origin as much as by a variety name. For example,  is the "hanging tomato of Vesuvius", or the well known and highly-prized San Marzano plum tomato grown in that region.

Britain 

Tomatoes were not grown in England until the 1590s. One of the earliest cultivators was John Gerard, a barber-surgeon. Gerard's Herbal, published in 1597, and largely plagiarized from continental sources, is also one of the earliest discussions of the tomato in England. Gerard knew the tomato was eaten in Spain and Italy. Nonetheless, he believed it was poisonous (in fact, the plant and raw fruit do have low levels of tomatine, but are not generally dangerous; see below). Gerard's views were influential, and the tomato was considered unfit for eating (though not necessarily poisonous) for many years in Britain and its North American colonies.

However, by the mid-18th century, tomatoes were widely eaten in Britain, and before the end of that century, the Encyclopædia Britannica stated the tomato was "in daily use" in soups, broths, and as a garnish. They were not part of the average person's diet, and though by 1820 they were described as "to be seen in great abundance in all our vegetable markets" and to be "used by all our best cooks", reference was made to their cultivation in gardens still "for the singularity of their appearance", while their use in cooking was associated with exotic Italian or Jewish cuisine.

India 
The tomato arrived in India by the way of Portuguese explorers, in the 16th century.

It was then adopted widely as it is well suited to India's climate, with Uttarakhand as one of the main producers.

Middle East and North Africa 
The tomato was introduced to cultivation in the Middle East by John Barker, British consul in Aleppo . Nineteenth century descriptions of its consumption are uniformly as an ingredient in a cooked dish. In 1881, it is described as only eaten in the region "within the last forty years". Today, the tomato is a critical and ubiquitous part of Middle Eastern cuisine, served fresh in salads (e.g., Arab salad, Israeli salad, Shirazi salad and Turkish salad), grilled with kebabs and other dishes, made into sauces, and so on.

United States 

The earliest reference to tomatoes being grown in British North America is from 1710, when herbalist William Salmon reported seeing them in what is today South Carolina. They may have been introduced from the Caribbean. By the mid-18th century, they were cultivated on some Carolina plantations, and probably in other parts of the Southeast as well. Possibly, some people continued to think tomatoes were poisonous at this time; and in general, they were grown more as ornamental plants than as food. Thomas Jefferson, who ate tomatoes in Paris, sent some seeds back to America. Some early American advocates of the culinary use of the tomato included Michele Felice Cornè and Robert Gibbon Johnson.

Early tomato breeders included Henry Tilden in Iowa and a Dr. Hand in Baltimore.

Alexander W. Livingston receives much credit for developing numerous varieties of tomato for both home and commercial gardeners. The U.S. Department of Agriculture's 1937 yearbook declared that "half of the major varieties were a result of the abilities of the Livingstons to evaluate and perpetuate superior material in the tomato." Livingston's first breed of tomato, the Paragon, was introduced in 1870, the beginning of a great tomato culture enterprise in the county. In 1875, he introduced the Acme, which was said to be involved in the parentage of most of the tomatoes introduced by him and his competitors for the next twenty-five years.

When Livingston began his attempts to develop the tomato as a commercial crop, his aim had been to grow tomatoes smooth in contour, uniform in size, and sweet in flavor. He eventually developed over seventeen different varieties of the tomato plant. Today, the crop is grown in every state in the Union.

Because of the long growing season needed for this heat-loving crop, several states in the US Sun Belt became major tomato-producers, particularly Florida and California. In California, tomatoes are grown under irrigation for both the fresh fruit market and for canning and processing. The University of California, Davis (UC Davis) became a major center for research on the tomato. The C.M. Rick Tomato Genetics Resource Center at UC Davis is a gene bank of wild relatives, monogenic mutants and miscellaneous genetic stocks of tomato. The center is named for the late Dr. Charles M. Rick, a pioneer in tomato genetics research. Research on processing tomatoes is also conducted by the California Tomato Research Institute in Escalon, California.

In California, growers have used a method of cultivation called dry-farming, especially with Early Girl tomatoes. This technique encourages the plant to send roots deep to find existing moisture in soil that retains moisture, such as clayey soil.

Modern commercial varieties 

The poor taste and lack of sugar in modern garden and commercial tomato varieties resulted from breeding tomatoes to ripen uniformly red. This change occurred after discovery of a mutant "u" phenotype in the mid-20th century, so named because the fruits ripened uniformly. This was widely cross-bred to produce red fruit without the typical green ring around the stem on uncross-bred varieties. Prior to general introduction of this trait, most tomatoes produced more sugar during ripening, and were sweeter and more flavorful.

Evidence has been found that 10–20% of the total carbon fixed in the fruit can be produced by photosynthesis in the developing fruit of the normal U phenotype. The u genetic mutation encodes a factor that produces defective chloroplasts with lower density in developing fruit, resulting in a lighter green colour of unripe fruit, and repression of sugars accumulation in the resulting ripe fruit by 10–15%. Perhaps more important than their role in photosynthesis, the fruit chloroplasts are remodelled during ripening into chlorophyll-free chromoplasts that synthesize and accumulate the carotenoids lycopene, β-carotene, and other metabolites that are sensory and nutritional assets of the ripe fruit. The potent chloroplasts in the dark-green shoulders of the U phenotype are beneficial here, but have the disadvantage of leaving green shoulders near the stems of the ripe fruit, and even cracked yellow shoulders, apparently because of oxidative stress due to overload of the photosynthetic chain in direct sunlight at high temperatures. Hence genetic design of a commercial variety that combines the advantages of types u and U requires fine tuning, but may be feasible.

Furthermore, breeders of modern tomato cultivars typically strive to produce tomato plants exhibiting improved yield, shelf life, size, and tolerance/resistance to various environmental pressures, including disease. However, these breeding efforts have yielded unintended negative consequences on various tomato fruit attributes. For instance, linkage drag is a phenomenon that has been responsible for alterations in the metabolism of the tomato fruit. Linkage drag describes the introduction of an undesired trait or allele into a plant during backcrossing. This trait/allele is physically linked (or is very close) to the desired allele along the chromosome. In introducing the beneficial allele, there exists a high likelihood that the poor allele is also incorporated into the plant. Thus, breeding efforts attempting to enhance certain traits (for example: larger fruit size) have unintentionally altered production of chemicals associated with, for instance, nutritional value and flavor.

Breeders have turned to using wild tomato species as a source of alleles for the introduction of beneficial traits into modern tomato varieties. For example, wild tomato relatives may possess higher amounts of fruit solids (which are associated with greater sugar content) or resistance to diseases caused by microbes, such as resistance towards the early blight pathogen Alternaria solani. However, this tactic has limitations, for the incorporation of certain traits, such as pathogen resistance, can negatively impact other favorable phenotypes, such as fruit production.

Cultivation 
The tomato is grown worldwide for its edible fruits, with thousands of cultivars. A fertilizer with an NPK ratio of 5–10–10 is often sold as tomato fertilizer or vegetable fertilizer, although manure and compost are also used. On average there are 150,000 seeds in a pound of tomato seeds.

Diseases 

Tomato cultivars vary widely in their resistance to disease. Modern hybrids focus on improving disease resistance over the heirloom plants.

Various forms of mildew and blight are common tomato afflictions, which is why tomato cultivars are often marked with a combination of letters that refer to specific disease resistance. The most common letters are:
 LB – 'late blight'
 V – verticillium wilt
 F – fusarium wilt strain I
 FF – fusarium wilt strain I and II
 N – nematodes
 T – tobacco mosaic virus, and
 A – alternaria.

A common tomato disease is tobacco mosaic virus. Handling cigarettes and other infected tobacco products can transmit the virus to tomato plants.

Another particularly dreaded disease is curly top, carried by the beet leafhopper, which interrupts the lifecycle. As the name implies, it has the symptom of making the top leaves of the plant wrinkle up and grow abnormally.

Bacterial wilt is another common disease impacting yield. Wang et al., 2019 found phage combination therapies to reduce the impact of bacterial wilt, sometimes by reducing bacterial abundance and sometimes by selecting for resistant but slow growing genetics.

Pests 
Some common tomato pests are the tomato bug, stink bugs, cutworms, tomato hornworms and tobacco hornworms, aphids, cabbage loopers, whiteflies, tomato fruitworms, flea beetles, red spider mite, slugs, and Colorado potato beetles. The tomato russet mite, Aculops lycopersici, feeds on foliage and young fruit of tomato plants, causing shrivelling and necrosis of leaves, flowers, and fruit, possibly killing the plant.

After an insect attack tomato plants produce systemin, a plant peptide hormone. Systemin activates defensive mechanisms, such as the production of protease inhibitors to slow the growth of insects. The hormone was first identified in tomatoes, but similar proteins have been identified in other species since.

Other disorders 

Although not a disease as such, irregular supplies of water can cause growing or ripening fruit to split. Besides cosmetic damage, the splits may allow decay to start, although growing fruits have some ability to heal after a split. In addition, a deformity called cat-facing can be caused by pests, temperature stress, or poor soil conditions. Affected fruit usually remains edible, but its appearance may be unsightly.

Companion plants 

Tomatoes serve, or are served by, a large variety of companion plants.

Among the most famous pairings is the tomato plant and carrots; studies supporting this relationship have produced a popular book about companion planting, Carrots Love Tomatoes.

The devastating tomato hornworm has a major predator in various parasitic wasps, whose larvae devour the hornworm, but whose adult form drinks nectar from tiny-flowered plants like umbellifers. Several species of umbellifer are therefore often grown with tomato plants, including parsley, Queen Anne's lace, and occasionally dill. These also attract predatory flies that attack various tomato pests.

Borage is thought to repel the tomato hornworm moth.

Plants with strong scents, like alliums (onions, chives, garlic), mints (basil, oregano, spearmint) and French marigold, (Tagetes patula) are thought to mask the scent of the tomato plant, making it harder for pests to locate it, or to provide an alternative landing point, reducing the odds of the pests from attacking the correct plant. These plants may also subtly affect the flavor of tomato fruit. Basil is popularly recommended as a companion plant to the tomato. Common claims are that basil may deter pests or improve tomato flavor. However, in double-blind taste tests, basil did not significantly affect the taste of tomatoes when planted adjacent to them.

Tomato plants can protect asparagus from asparagus beetles, because they contain solanine that kills this pest, while asparagus plants contain Asparagusic acid that repels nematodes known to attack tomato plants. Marigolds also repel nematodes.

Pollination 

In the wild, original state, tomatoes required cross-pollination; they were much more self-incompatible than domestic cultivars. As a floral device to reduce selfing, the pistil of wild tomatoes extends farther out of the flower than today's cultivars. The stamens were, and remain, entirely within the closed corolla.

As tomatoes were moved from their native areas, their traditional pollinators (probably a species of halictid bee) did not move with them. The trait of self-fertility became an advantage, and domestic cultivars of tomato have been selected to maximize this trait.

This is not the same as self-pollination, despite the common claim that tomatoes do so. That tomatoes pollinate themselves poorly without outside aid is clearly shown in greenhouse situations, where pollination must be aided by artificial wind, vibration of the plants (one brand of vibrator is a wand called an "electric bee" that is used manually), or more often today, by cultured bumblebees. The anther of a tomato flower is shaped like a hollow tube, with the pollen produced within the structure, rather than on the surface, as in most species. The pollen moves through pores in the anther, but very little pollen is shed without some kind of externally-induced motion. The ideal vibratory frequencies to release pollen grains are provided by an insect, such as a bumblebee, or the original wild halictid pollinator, capable of engaging in a behavior known as buzz pollination, which honey bees cannot perform. In an outdoors setting, wind or animals usually provide sufficient motion to produce commercially viable crops.

Fruit formation 
Pollination and fruit formation depend on meiosis. Meiosis is central to the processes by which diploid microspore mother cells within the anther give rise to haploid pollen grains, and megaspore mother cells in ovules that are contained within the ovary give rise to haploid nuclei. Union of haploid nuclei from pollen and ovule (fertilization) can occur either by self- or cross-pollination. Fertilization leads to the formation of a diploid zygote that can then develop into an embryo within the emerging seed. Repeated fertilizations within the ovary are accompanied by maturation of the ovary to form the tomato fruit.

Homologs of the recA gene, including rad51, play a key role in homologous recombinational repair of DNA during meiosis. A rad51 homolog is present in the anther of tomato (Lycopersicon esculentum), suggesting that recombinational repair occurs during meiosis in tomato.

Hydroponic and greenhouse cultivation 

Tomatoes are often grown in greenhouses in cooler climates, and cultivars such as the British 'Moneymaker' and a number of cultivars grown in Siberia are specifically bred for indoor growing. In more temperate climates, it is not uncommon to start seeds in greenhouses during the late winter for future transplant.

Greenhouse tomato production in large-acreage commercial greenhouses and owner-operator stand-alone or multiple-bay greenhouses is on the increase, providing fruit during those times of the year when field-grown fruit is not readily available. Smaller sized fruit (cherry and grape), or cluster tomatoes (fruit-on-the-vine) are the fruit of choice for the large commercial greenhouse operators while the beefsteak varieties are the choice of owner-operator growers.

Hydroponic technique is often used in hostile growing environments, as well as high-density plantings.

Picking and ripening 

To facilitate transportation and storage, tomatoes are often picked unripe (green) and ripened in storage with ethylene.

A machine-harvestable variety of tomato (the "square tomato") was developed in the 1950s by University of California, Davis's Gordie C. Hanna, which, in combination with the development of a suitable harvester, revolutionized the tomato-growing industry. This type of tomato is grown commercially near plants that process and can tomatoes, tomato sauce, and tomato paste. They are harvested when ripe and are flavorful when picked. They are harvested 24 hours a day, seven days a week during a 12- to 14-week season, and immediately transported to packing plants, which operate on the same schedule. California is a center of this sort of commercial tomato production and produces about a third of the processed tomatoes produced in the world.

In 1994, Calgene introduced a genetically modified tomato called the FlavrSavr, which could be vine ripened without compromising shelf life. However, the product was not commercially successful, and was sold only until 1997.

Yield 

The world dedicated 4.8 million hectares in 2012 for tomato cultivation and the total production was about 161.8 million tonnes. The average world farm yield for tomato was 33.6 tonnes per hectare in 2012.

Tomato farms in the Netherlands were the most productive in 2012, with a nationwide average of 476 tonnes per hectare, followed by Belgium (463 tonnes per hectare) and Iceland (429 tonnes per hectare).

Records 

The largest tomato plant grown was of the cultivar "Sungold" and reached  in length, grown by Nutriculture Ltd (UK) of Mawdesley, Lancashire, UK, in 2000.

A massive "tomato tree" growing inside the Walt Disney World Resort's experimental greenhouses in Lake Buena Vista, Florida may have been the largest single tomato plant in the world. It yielded thousands of tomatoes at one time from a single vine. Yong Huang, Epcot's manager of agricultural science, discovered the unique plant in Beijing, China. Huang brought its seeds to Epcot and created the specialized greenhouse for the fruit to grow. The vine grew golf ball-sized tomatoes, which were served at Walt Disney World restaurants. The tree developed a disease and was removed in April 2010 after about 13 months of life.

Production 

In 2021, world production of tomatoes was 189 million tonnes, with China accounting for 35% of the total, followed by India, the European Union, Turkey, and the United States as major producers (see table).

Consumption 

Though it is botanically a berry, a subset of fruit, the tomato is a vegetable for culinary purposes because of its savoury flavour (see above).

Although tomatoes originated in the Americas, they have become extensively used in Mediterranean cuisine. Ripe tomatoes contain significant umami flavor and they are a key ingredient in pizza, and are commonly used in pasta sauces. One study showed that the inner pulp, as opposed to the outer flesh, has a deeper umami taste.

The tomato is now grown and eaten around the world. It is used in diverse ways, including raw in salads or in slices, stewed, incorporated into a wide variety of dishes, or processed into ketchup or tomato soup. Unripe green tomatoes can also be breaded and fried, used to make salsa, or pickled. Tomato juice is sold as a drink, and is used in cocktails such as the Bloody Mary.

Storage 
Tomatoes keep best unwashed at room temperature and out of direct sunlight. It is not recommended to refrigerate them as this can harm the flavour. Tomatoes stored cold tend to lose their flavour permanently.

Storing stem down can prolong shelf life, as it may keep from rotting too quickly.

Tomatoes that are not yet ripe can be kept in a paper bag till ripening.

Tomatoes are easy to preserve whole, in pieces, as tomato sauce or paste by home canning. They are acidic enough to process in a water bath rather than a pressure cooker as most vegetables require. The fruit is also preserved by drying, often in the sun, and sold either in bags or in jars with oil.

Safety

Plant toxicity
The leaves, stem, and green unripe fruit of the tomato plant contain small amounts of the alkaloid tomatine, whose effect on humans has not been studied. They also contain small amounts of solanine, a toxic alkaloid found in potato leaves and other plants in the nightshade family. However, solanine concentrations in foliage and green fruit are generally too small to be dangerous unless large amounts are consumed—for example, as greens.

Small amounts of tomato foliage are sometimes used for flavoring without ill effect, and the green fruit of unripe red tomato varieties is sometimes used for cooking, particularly as fried green tomatoes. There are also tomato varieties with fully ripe fruit that is still green. Compared to potatoes, the amount of solanine in unripe green or fully ripe tomatoes is low. However, even in the case of potatoes, while solanine poisoning resulting from dosages several times the normal human consumption has been demonstrated, actual cases of poisoning from excessive consumption of potatoes are rare.

Tomato plants can be toxic to dogs if they eat large amounts of the fruit, or chew plant material.

Salmonella 
Tomatoes were linked to seven Salmonella outbreaks between 1990 and 2005, and may have been the cause of a salmonellosis outbreak causing 172 illnesses in 18 US states in 2006. The 2008 United States salmonellosis outbreak caused the temporary removal of tomatoes from stores and restaurants across the United States and parts of Canada, although other foods, including jalapeño and serrano peppers, may have been involved.

Nutrition 

A raw tomato is 95% water, contains 4% carbohydrates, and has less than 1% each of fat and protein (table). In a  reference amount, raw tomatoes supply 18 kilocalories and are a moderate source of vitamin C (17% of the Daily Value), but otherwise have no significant micronutrient content (table).

Research 
There is no conclusive evidence to indicate that the lycopene in tomatoes or in supplements affects the onset of cardiovascular diseases or cancer.

In the United States, supposed health benefits of consuming tomatoes, tomato products or lycopene to affect cancer cannot be mentioned on packaged food products without a qualified health claim statement. In a scientific review of potential claims for lycopene favorably affecting DNA, skin exposed to ultraviolet radiation, heart function and vision, the European Food Safety Authority concluded that the evidence for lycopene having any of these effects was inconclusive.

Host plant 
The Potato Tuber moth (Phthorimaea operculella) is an oligophagous insect that prefers to feed on plants of the family Solanaceae such as tomato plants. Female P. operculella use the leaves to lay their eggs and the hatched larvae will eat away at the mesophyll of the leaf.

In popular culture 

The town of Buñol, Spain, annually celebrates La Tomatina, a festival centered on an enormous tomato fight. On 30 August 2007, 40,000 Spaniards gathered to throw  of tomatoes at each other in the festival.

Several US states have adopted the tomato as a state fruit or vegetable (see above). Tomatoes have been designated the state vegetable of New Jersey. Arkansas took both sides by declaring the South Arkansas Vine Ripe Pink Tomato both the state fruit and the state vegetable in the same law, citing both its culinary and botanical classifications. In 2009, the state of Ohio passed a law making the tomato the state's official fruit. Tomato juice has been the official beverage of Ohio since 1965. Alexander W. Livingston, of Reynoldsburg, Ohio, played a large part in popularizing the tomato in the late 19th century; his efforts are commemorated in Reynoldsburg with an annual Tomato Festival.

Flavr Savr was the first commercially grown genetically engineered food licensed for human consumption.

Tomatoes are a popular "nonlethal" throwing weapon in mass protests, and there was a common tradition of throwing rotten tomatoes at bad performers on a stage during the 19th century; today this is usually referenced as a metaphor. Embracing it for this protest connotation, the Dutch Socialist party adopted the tomato as their logo.

The US city of Reynoldsburg, Ohio calls itself "The Birthplace of the Tomato", claiming the first commercial variety of tomato was bred there in the 19th century.

"Rotten Tomatoes" is an American review-aggregation website for film and television. The name "Rotten Tomatoes" derives from the practice of audiences throwing rotten tomatoes when disapproving of a poor stage performance.

Gallery

See also 

 List of countries by tomato production
 List of tomato dishes
 Marglobe, an early attempt at breeding a disease-resistant tomato
 Ring culture
 Physalis, a similar fruit also used in cooking
 Tomato effect
 Tomato jam
 Nightshades
 Potato
 Eggplant
 Tomatillo, a similar fruit from the related genus

References

Further reading 
 David Gentilcore. Pomodoro! A History of the Tomato in Italy (Columbia University Press, 2010), scholarly history

External links 

 Tomato Genome Sequencing Project – Sequencing of the twelve tomato chromosomes.
 Tomato core collection database – Phenotypes and images of 7,000 tomato cultivars

 
Crops originating from Mexico
Crops originating from indigenous Americans
Crops originating from the Americas
Fruit vegetables
Fruits originating in North America
Fruits originating in South America
Plants described in 1753
Solanum